Andrea Rosenov Hristov (born 1 March 1999) is a Bulgarian professional footballer who plays as a defender for Italian  club Reggiana on loan from Cosenza.

Career

Slavia Sofia
Hristov started his career at Levski Sofia before moving to Slavia Sofia in 2013. He made his competitive debut for Slavia on 1 October 2016, coming as a substitute in a league match against Vereya, playing alongside his twin brother Petko.

On 3 April 2017, Hristov signed a professional contract with the team until 31 July 2020. On 21 April 2018 Hristov was named as a captain of the team in the match against Cherno More Varna.

Cosenza (loan)
On 29 January 2019 Hristov joined Seria B team Cosenza on loan until end of the season with a buyout clause.

Cosenza
On 13 January 2022, he returned to Cosenza and signed a 3.5-year contract with the club. On 1 September 2022, Hristov was loaned by Reggiana.

International career

Youth levels
Hristov was called up for the Bulgaria U19 team for the 2017 European Under-19 Championship qualification from 22 to 27 March 2017. After a draw and 2 wins the team qualified for the knockout phase, which will be held in July 2017.

Senior levels
He was called up by Georgi Dermendzhiev for a friendly match against Belarus in February 2020, but remained on the bench. He made his debut on 31 March 2021 in a World Cup qualifier against Northern Ireland. His brother Petko made his debut in the same game as well.

Personal life
Andrea Hristov has a twin brother, Petko, who is also a professional footballer.

Career statistics

Club

International goals
Scores and results list Bulgaria's goal tally first.

Honours
Slavia Sofia
 Bulgarian Cup (1): 2017–18

References

External links

1999 births
Footballers from Sofia
Bulgarian twins
Twin sportspeople
Living people
Bulgarian footballers
Bulgaria youth international footballers
Bulgaria under-21 international footballers
Bulgaria international footballers
Association football defenders
PFC Slavia Sofia players
Cosenza Calcio players
A.C. Reggiana 1919 players
Serie B players
First Professional Football League (Bulgaria) players
Bulgarian expatriate footballers
Expatriate footballers in Italy
Bulgarian expatriate sportspeople in Italy